The March (or Margraviate) of Carniola was a southeastern state of the Holy Roman Empire in the High Middle Ages, the predecessor of the Duchy of Carniola. It corresponded roughly to the central Carniolan region of present-day Slovenia. At the time of its creation, the march served as a frontier defense against the Kingdoms of Hungary and Croatia.

History

Before the coming of the Romans (c. 200 BC), the Taurisci dwelt in the north of Carniola, the Pannonians in the south-east, the Iapodes or Carni, a Celtic tribe, in the south-west.

Carniola formed part of the Roman province of Pannonia; the northern part was joined to Noricum, the south-western and south-eastern parts and the city of Aemona to Venice and Istria. In the time of Augustus all the region from Aemona to Kolpa river belonged to the province of Savia.

After the fall of the Western Roman Empire (476), Carniola was incorporated into the Kingdom of Italy, and (493) under Theodoric it formed part of the Ostrogothic kingdom. Between the upper Sava and the Soča rivers lived the Carni, and towards the end of the sixth century Slavs settled the region called by Latin writers Carnia, or Carniola meaning, "little Carnia", i.e., part of greater Carnia. Later on the name was changed to Krajina or, in German, Chrainmark. The new inhabitants were subjected to the Avars.

Foundation
The march of Carniola on the eastern slope of the Julian Alps probably dates back to the late ninth century, when it was formed alongside the marches of Carinthia, Istria, and Pannonia and was especially susceptible to Magyar raids. In 952, Carniola was placed under the authority of the Dukes of Bavaria, as were Carinthia, Istria, and Friuli. 

In 976, Emperor Otto II deposed the rebellious Bavarian duke Henry the Wrangler and ceded the duchy to his nephew Otto of Swabia. In turn, he separated the southeastern marches from the Bavarian duchy and elevated Carinthia to a duchy in its own right. Henry the Younger, a member of the Bavarian Luitpolding dynasty, was appointed first duke and acted as a sort of "chief of the border police", controlling the Carniolan march, the March of Styria, the Mark an der Drau and Mark an der Sann, as well as the vast March of Verona with Friuli and Istria.

In 1040, King Henry III of Germany separated Carniola from the Duchy of Carinthia and granted the Windic March (later Lower Carniola) to the former. The reason for the split was partly military considerations and partly the innate distinctness of the region, whose pattern of German colonisation differed from that of Carinthia proper north of the Karawanks. Carniola had been additionally settled mostly by Bavarians with a minority of Swabians and retained its Slovene culture while most of Carinthia adopted German culture. The most prominent Bavarian families were the Hoflein, Stein, Hertenberg, Reydeck, and Rabensberg, while the Swabian families of the Auersperg, Osterberg, and Gallenberg were also represented. 
Initially, the margraviate was bordered by Carinthia and Styria (elevated to a duchy in 1156) to the north, the Croatia and Slavonia to the east, Istria and Dalmatia to the south, and Friuli, Gorizia, Udine and Gradisca to the west. The Carniolan lands were bound informally to the other marches of the southeast of the Empire in what has been termed the "Austrian complex" because of the supremacy which Austria quickly obtained over the others and the way in which they tended to follow her. Due to this informal cohesion, Carniola was more like a geographical part than a whole and it was often combined to its neighbours and granted out as payment for electoral support. Nevertheless, its status as the most southeasterly of the marches helped it retain its marcher privileges well into the thirteenth century and long after the other regions, especially Friuli, had lost theirs.

Patriarchal rule
On 11 June 1077, Carniola and Istria were transferred by King Henry IV of Germany to the powerful patriarchs of Aquileia. Nevertheless, secular margraves were still appointed and the territory was administered as a separate province. After the extinction of the Thuringian counts of Weimar upon the death of Margrave Ulric II in 1112 (he may have resigned his march in 1107 or 1108), the patriarchate took over the governing of the territory, against the resistance of the Rhenish House of Sponheim, dukes of Carinthia from 1122. The Patriarchs partitioned the territory between several powerful fiefs, the most prominent of which were the Bavarian counts of Andechs (later dukes of Merania), the Meinhardiner dynasty of Gorizia (Görz), and the Counts of Celje.

In the twelfth century, the Republic of Venice gradually acquired the Istrian littoral and Carniola took control of what remained of the Istrian march around Pazin (Mitterburg). Soon Carniola extended over the Kras Plateau and had two small seacoasts on the Gulf of Trieste and the Gulf of Kvarner. It reached to the Friulian Isonzo valley, but not the river itself. This change in its geographical constitution was accompanied by increased interest on the part of nearby landlocked powers. In 1245, Patriarch Berthold gave Carniola to the Babenberg duke Frederick II of Austria, husband of Agnes of Merania, with royal consent.

Bohemian rule
Around 1254, Carniola lost its marcher privileges. When Duke Frederick II of Austria died without male heirs in 1246, Carniola was given to the last Sponheim duke Ulric III of Carinthia, a cousin of the patriarch who married Frederick's widow Agnes. Ulric developed Carniola, endowing many lands to the church and establishing a mint at Kostanjevica. As he himself left no heirs, he willed his lands to his cousin, the Přemyslid king Ottokar II of Bohemia in 1268. Ottokar likewise had acquired the princeless Duchy of Austria with Styria, and upon Ulric's death in 1269 he united Carinthia and Carniola to his Crown.

In 1273 Ottokar became embroiled in a dispute with the Swabian count Rudolf of Habsburg over his election as King of the Romans. The next year Rudolf and the Imperial Diet of Nuremberg demanded that all fiefs acquired during the interregnum after the death of Emperor Frederick II of Hohenstaufen in 1250 were to revert to the Imperial crown, a demand which would have applied to Austria, Carinthia and Carniola. Ottokar refused, but was eventually put under Imperial ban in 1276 and forced to cede the lands, only retaining his Kingdom of Bohemia with Moravia. Two years later he was defeated and killed in the Battle on the Marchfeld. Under Habsburg rule, Carniola became a frontier against Venice in the southwest, while its eastern border with Hungary remained stable.

Austrian rule
Rudolph enfeoffed Carniola to his sons Albert and Rudolf II in 1282 after a meeting in Augsburg, but instead he leased the margraviate to his ally Count Meinhard of Tyrol, whom he appointed Duke of Carinthia from 1286. It remained with the Meinhardiner dynasty until Meinard's son, Duke Henry VI of Carinthia, died in 1335. The Luxembourg king John I of Bohemia renounced his rights of inheritance and the Habsburg dukes Otto and Albert II of Austria gained Carniola despite a former agreement the late Duke Henry had made with Emperor Louis the Bavarian, whereby his daughters Adelaide and Margaret of Tyrol would inherit his lands.

Albert's son Duke Rudolf IV of Austria declared Carniola a Duchy in 1364, although like his claiming of the title of "Archduke of Austria" by the Privilegium Maius, such an elevation was beyond his jurisdiction. The ducal title was not confirmed until much later: this time 1590. By the 1379 Treaty of Neuberg, Carniola was attached to the Inner Austrian possessions of the Habsburg Leopoldian line.

List of margraves
Winther († after 12 March 933)
Udalrich von Ebersberg, 1011–1029
Eberhard II von Ebersberg, 1040
Poppo I, 1040–1044, Count of Weimar, also Margrave of Istria since 1012
Ulric I, 1045–1070, son, Count of Weimar, also Margrave of Istria from 1060
Poppo II, 1070–1098, son,  also Margrave of Istria from 1096
Ulric II, 1098–1107, brother, Count of Weimar, also Margrave of Istria
House of Sponheim
Engelbert I, 1107–1124, also Margrave of Istria, Duke of Carinthia from 1122
Engelbert II, 1124–1173, son, also Margrave of Istria
House of Andechs
Berthold I, 1173–1188, also Margrave of Istria
Berthold II, 1188–1204, also Duke of Merania
Henry, 1204–1228
Otto I, 1228–1234
Otto II, 1234–1248
House of Babenberg
Frederick II the Warlike, 1245–1246, Duke of Austria and Styria since 1230
House of Sponheim
Ulric III, 1248–1269, also Duke of Carinthia from 1256
Přemyslid dynasty
Ottokar II, 1269–1276, King of Bohemia, also Duke of Austria, Styria and Carinthia
House of Habsburg
Rudolph, 1276–1286, German king (King of the Romans) since 1273, also Duke of Austria, Styria and Carinthia until 1282
House of Gorizia
Meinhard, 1286–1295, Count of Tyrol since 1258, also Duke of Carinthia 
Henry, 1295–1335, son, also King of Bohemia 1306 and 1307–10, Duke of Carinthia and Count of Tyrol
House of Habsburg
Albert II, 1335–1358, grandson of King Rudolph, Duke of Austria and Styria since 1330, also Duke of Carinthia
Rudolph IV, 1358–1364, son, also Duke of Austria, Styria and Carinthia, Count of Tyrol from 1363
declared himself "Duke of Carniola" in 1364.

Notes

References

Carniola
Carniola
Medieval Slovenia
Former states and territories in Slovenia
History of Carniola
States and territories established in 1040
States and territories disestablished in 1364
Duchy of Carniola
Duchy of Carniola
1040s establishments in the Holy Roman Empire
1360s disestablishments in the Holy Roman Empire
Carniola

de:Krain#Geschichte